Ronald Stockin (born 27 June 1931) was an English professional footballer who played as an inside forward.

References

1931 births
Footballers from Birmingham, West Midlands
English footballers
Association football inside forwards
West Bromwich Albion F.C. players
Walsall F.C. players
Wolverhampton Wanderers F.C. players
Cardiff City F.C. players
Grimsby Town F.C. players
Nuneaton Borough F.C. players
English Football League players
Living people